The Taposa were an American Indian tribe located in the south of the United States, originating from the area that is now the state of Mississippi.  Their earliest known location was on Yazoo River, near the Chakchiuma and Chickasaw tribes.

The original meaning of the name "Taposa" has been lost.

References 

Native American tribes in Mississippi
Indigenous peoples of the Southeastern Woodlands